Parvarish is a 1958 Indian Hindi-language film starring Raj Kapoor, Mala Sinha and Mehmood. It was later adapted into the Tamil play Petral Thaan Pillaiya, which in turn was adapted into the Tamil film Paar Magaley Paar (1963).

Plot 
After a hospital accident, a wealthy man is compelled to adopt a prostitute's son. After the incident, Thakur Jaswants takes both the infants with him. They waits for the guardian of the other child. As they are not able to decide which is their own child.

After some days, a man named Banke Bihari comes to meet Jaswant. He told him that, the other child, who is the son of a prostitute, is his nephew and the prostitute was his sister. The lady left this world after giving birth to her son in that fire accident. So, he wants to take the other child with him. But he is also unable identify his nephew.

Cast 
 Raj Kapoor as Raja Singh
 Mala Sinha as Asha Singh
 Mehmood as Ramesh Singh
 Nazir Hussain as Thakur Jaswant Singh
 Lalita Pawar as Thakurain Rukmani Singh
 Krishnakant as Thakur Harnam Singh / Bade Thakur (Asha's Father)
 Radhakrishan as Ustad Banke Bihari "Mama"
 Brahm Bhardwaj as Doctor
 Jennifer Murray as Dancer / Singer at Club

Soundtrack

References

External links 
 

1950s Hindi-language films
1958 films